Amandinea decedens is a crustose lichen in the family Caliciaceae, first described as Lecidea decedens by Finnish botanist William Nylander in 1869.  It was assigned (invalidly) the name, Amandinea decedens, in 2002 by Juliane Blaha and Helmut Mayrhofer. The name was validly published in 2016 by Blaha, Mayrhofer and Jack Elix

On coastal rocks, when it is found, it is abundant.

References

External links
Amandinea decedens: images and occurrence data from GBIF

decedens
Lichen species
Lichens described in 1869
Taxa named by William Nylander (botanist)